Elections in the Republic of India in 1988 included elections to 2 state legislative assemblies and to seats in the Rajya Sabha.

Legislative Assembly elections

Meghalaya 

Elections were held on 2 February for the Legislative Assembly.

Tripura

Rajya Sabha

References

External links

 

1988 elections in India
India
1988 in India
Elections in India by year